The Sturgeon River is a river in the Atlantic Ocean drainage basin in Kings County in eastern Prince Edward Island, Canada.

Course
It flows north, then turns east, passes over a dam, and flows past the community of Milltown Cross and Buffaloland Provincial Park. Sturgeon Bay is part of the larger St. Marys Bay on the Northumberland Strait on the Gulf of Saint Lawrence, which leads to the Atlantic Ocean.

Tributaries
South Branch Sturgeon River (right)
West Branch Sturgeon River (left)

References

Landforms of Kings County, Prince Edward Island
Rivers of Prince Edward Island